The 1998 Sydney International was a tennis tournament played on outdoor hard courts at the NSW Tennis Centre in Sydney, Australia that was part of the International Series of the 1998 ATP Tour and of Tier II of the 1998 WTA Tour. The tournament was held from 11 through 17 January 1998.

Seeds
Champion seeds are indicated in bold text while text in italics indicates the round in which those seeds were eliminated.

Draw

Finals

References

Men's Doubles
Doubles